The Oath of Supremacy required any person taking public or church office in England to swear allegiance to the monarch as Supreme Governor of the Church of England. Failure to do so was to be treated as treasonable. The Oath of Supremacy was originally imposed by King Henry VIII of England through the Act of Supremacy 1534, but repealed by his elder daughter, Queen Mary I of England, and reinstated under Henry's other daughter and Mary's half-sister, Queen Elizabeth I of England, under the Act of Supremacy 1559. The Oath was later extended to include Members of Parliament (MPs) and people studying at universities.

Requirement of the oath began to subside when Catholics were first allowed to become members of parliament in an act in 1829, and the requirement to take the oath for Oxford University students was lifted by the Oxford University Act 1854.

Text of the Oath as published in 1535
I (state your name) do utterly testifie and declare in my Conscience, that the Kings Highnesse is the onely Supreame Governour of this Realme, and all other his Highnesse Dominions and Countries, as well in all Spirituall or Ecclesiasticall things or causes, as Temporall: And that no forraine Prince, Person, Prelate, State or Potentate, hath or ought to have any Jurisdiction, Power, Superiorities, Preeminence or Authority Ecclesiasticall or Spirituall within this Realme. And therefore, I do utterly renounce and forsake all Jurisdictions, Powers, Superiorities, or Authorities; and do promise that from henchforth I shall beare faith and true Allegiance to the Kings Highnesse, his Heires and lawfull Successors: and to my power shall assist and defend all Jurisdictions, Privileges, Preheminences and Authorities granted or belonging to the Kings Highnesse, his Heires and Successors or united and annexed to the Imperial Crowne of the Realme: so helpe me God: and by the Contents of this Booke.

Text of the Oath as published in 1559
I, A. B., do utterly testify and declare in my conscience that the Queen's Highness is the only supreme governor of this realm, and of all other her Highness's dominions and countries, as well in all spiritual or ecclesiastical things or causes, as temporal, and that no foreign prince, person, prelate, state or potentate hath or ought to have any jurisdiction, power, superiority, pre-eminence or authority ecclesiastical or spiritual within this realm; and therefore I do utterly renounce and forsake all foreign jurisdictions, powers, superiorities and authorities, and do promise that from henceforth I shall bear faith and true allegiance to the Queen's Highness, her heirs and lawful successors, and to my power shall assist and defend all jurisdictions, pre-eminences, privileges and authorities granted or belonging to the Queen's Highness, her heirs or successors, or united or annexed to the imperial crown of this realm. So help me God, and by the contents of this Book.

Punishment
Roman Catholics who refused to take the Oath of Supremacy were indicted for treason on charges of praemunire. For example, Sir Thomas More opposed the King's separation from the Roman Catholic Church in the English Reformation and refused to accept him as Supreme Head of the Church of England, a title which had been given by parliament through the Act of Supremacy of 1534. He was imprisoned in 1534 for his refusal to take the oath, because the act discredited Papal Authority, and his refusal to accept the annulment of Henry’s marriage to Catherine of Aragon. In 1535, he was tried for treason, convicted on perjured testimony, and beheaded.

Exceptions
Under the reigns of Charles II and James II, the Oath of Supremacy was not so widely employed by the Crown. This was largely due to the Catholic sympathies and practices of these monarchs, and the resulting high number of Roman Catholics serving in official positions. Examples of officials who never had to take the Oath include the Catholic Privy Counsellors, Sir Stephen Rice and Justin McCarthy, Viscount Mountcashel. The centrality of the Oath was re-established under the reign of William III and Mary II, following the Glorious Revolution.

Abolition for MPs
In 1828 Daniel O'Connell defeated a member of the British cabinet in a parliamentary by-election in County Clare. His triumph, as the first Catholic to be returned in a parliamentary election since 1688, made a clear issue of the oath, as it required that MPs acknowledge the King as "Supreme Governor" of the Church and thus forswear the Roman communion. Fearful of the widespread disturbances that might follow from continuing to insist on the letter of the oath, the government finally relented. With the Prime Minister, the Duke of Wellington, persuading the King, George IV, and the Home Secretary, Sir Robert Peel, engaging the Whig opposition, the Catholic Relief Act became law in 1829.

See also
Oath of Allegiance (United Kingdom)
Elizabethan Religious Settlement
Religion in the United Kingdom
Augustine Webster

References

Anglicanism
History of the Church of England
1559 in law
Supremacy
Reformation in Ireland